The 1953 Rhode Island Rams football team was an American football team that represented the University of Rhode Island as a member of the Yankee Conference during the 1953 college football season. In its third season under head coach Hal Kopp, the team compiled a 6–2 record (3–1 against conference opponents), tied for the conference championship, and outscored opponents by a total of 148 to 100. The team played its home games at Meade Stadium in Kingston, Rhode Island.

Schedule

References

Rhode Island
Rhode Island Rams football seasons
Yankee Conference football champion seasons
Rhode Island Rams football